853 Nansenia is a minor planet orbiting the Sun. It is named after the Norwegian polar explorer and Nobel Peace Prize laureate Fridtjof Nansen.

References

External links 
 
 

000853
Discoveries by Sergei Belyavsky
Named minor planets
000853
000853
19160402
Fridtjof Nansen